Bellister Bridge is a concrete bridge across the River South Tyne at Haltwhistle in Northumberland, England.

History
The bridge, which was designed to provide road access to the village of Plenmeller on the south bank of the river, was completed in 1967. After the Haltwhistle bypass opened, the road was no longer required and it has solely been used a footbridge since the late 1990s. The bridge also provides access to Bellister Castle on the south bank of the river.

References

Bridges in Northumberland
Crossings of the River Tyne
Haltwhistle